Hardwicke Drummond Rawnsley (29 September 1851 – 28 May 1920) was an Anglican priest, poet, local politician and conservationist. He became nationally and internationally known as one of the three founders of the National Trust for Places of Historic Interest or Natural Beauty in the 1890s.

Rawnsley was descended from a line of Church of England vicars, and after briefly considering medicine as a career he graduated from Oxford and took holy orders. In the mid-1870s he worked with the urban poor in London and Bristol, before being appointed in 1877 to a rural parish in Westmorland in the English Lake District. He soon became a vigorous activist in the campaign to preserve the region from excessive industrial development.

In 1883 Rawnsley was appointed Vicar of Crosthwaite, Cumberland, in the north of the Lake District. He remained in the post for 34 years, becoming known locally and nationally for his energetic efforts to improve life for working people. He and his wife founded the Keswick School of Industrial Art, and he led campaigns to make access to the countryside available for everyone. Concluding that protests and legislation were not enough to protect the environment, he joined Robert Hunter and Octavia Hill in 1893 to found the National Trust to own land on the public's behalf. It grew to become one of Britain's largest and most important landowners, holding land and buildings in trust for the people of Britain.

Rawnsley was a prolific writer, publishing more than 40 books, including verse, sermons, historical studies, travel accounts and biographies. He retired in 1917 and moved to the village of Grasmere, in the southern Lake District, where he died in 1920, aged 68.

Life and career

Early years

Hardwicke Rawnsley – known to his family and intimates as "Hardie" – was born at the rectory, Shiplake, Oxfordshire on 28 September 1851. He was the second son and fourth of the ten children of the Rev Robert Drummond Burrell Rawnsley (1817–1882) and his wife, Catherine Ann, née Franklin (1818–1892). In 1862 Drummond Rawnsley accepted the post of vicar of Halton Holegate in the fen district of Lincolnshire. According to Hardwicke Rawnsley's biographer Vivian Griffiths, "Observing the wildlife of the Fens, the construction of the Holbeach-to-Spilsby railway and watching the navvies building embankments were to be formative influences". 

Later in 1862, aged eleven, Rawnsley enrolled at Uppingham School, where his godfather, Edward Thring, was headmaster.  Thring became a major influence on him: Rawnsley excelled at athletics and gymnastics, but Thring encouraged his aesthetic side, particularly his budding gifts as a poet. The historian George Bott writes:

In 1869 Thring introduced Rawnsley to the Lake District, staying in Grasmere village, where William Wordsworth had lived. Rawnsley quickly came to share the enthusiasm shown by Wordsworth and others for the Lake District landscape.

In 1870 Rawnsley went up to Balliol College, Oxford, initially reading classics but switching after two years to natural sciences, with the intention of becoming a medical practitioner. He was at first an exuberant undergraduate, prominent in athletics and rowing, and not conspicuously conscientious about his studies. His outlook became more serious under the influence of the art critic and social campaigner John Ruskin. Rawnsley was one of a group of undergraduate volunteers – others were Oscar Wilde and Arnold Toynbee – who undertook manual labour under Ruskin's direction to improve the road and drainage between Oxford and the village of Hinksey. The project foundered after two months when Ruskin left for Venice, but for Rawnsley it was, in Griffiths's words, "life-changing, his social conscience awakened". He began to think that the Church rather than medicine was his vocation. In 1874 he graduated with a third class degree in natural sciences and the following year was awarded his Master of Arts degree.

London and Bristol

After leaving Oxford, Rawnsley went to work among the urban poor in London. He was appointed lay-chaplain to the Newport Market Refuge, a hostel for the destitute, in the parish of St Mary's, Soho, an insalubrious part of London known for prostitution and poverty. Ruskin introduced him to Octavia Hill, the pioneer of social housing, and Rawnsley added to his workload the role of rent-collector for Hill's colleague Emma Cons. Under the strain of his various activities he suffered a nervous breakdown. At Hill's suggestion he went to the Lake District to recuperate, staying first with his cousins at Wray Castle, Westmorland, and then with Thring at Grasmere and finally with Hill's friends the Fletcher family at their house near Ambleside. The eldest daughter of his host and hostess was Edith Fletcher (1846–1916); she and Rawnsley were mutually attracted, with shared interests in art, literature and nature.

In December 1875 Rawnsley, his health restored, was ordained deacon. On Thring's recommendation he was appointed to the new post of chaplain to the Clifton College mission, ministering to one of Bristol's poorest areas. At first there was no building in which services could be held, but Rawnsley secured a disused factory workshop and converted it into a chapel. The ecclesiastical authorities felt that he went too far in his efforts to attract young locals, not confining himself to religious services but organising a temperance club, regular football matches and weekend country walks. He campaigned to save the disused 14th-century St Werburgh's Church from demolition. It was taken down stone by stone and re-erected on a new site. His enthusiasms did not endear him to the conservative hierarchy of the Bristol church, but when he left his post in 1877 he was presented with a testimonial to his work by the mayor and other leading citizens.

Vicar of Wray
In 1877 Rawnsley and Edith Fletcher became engaged to be married and he began making plans for their life together. His cousin Edward Rawnsley's estate at Wray Castle contained a parish church, St Margaret of Antioch, Low Wray. The post of vicar there became vacant and Edward offered it to Rawnsley, who was ordained priest in Carlisle Cathedral on 23 December 1877 and took up the appointment at Wray.

Rawnsley and Edith were married in the Fletchers' local church at Brathay in January 1878, in a service conducted by Drummond Rawnsley. The couple's only child, Noel, was born at Wray in December 1880. According to the biographer Graham Murphy, "because of his parents' numerous activities and love of travel [Noel] suffered a somewhat solitary childhood".

By this time, Ruskin had made his home in the Lake District; since 1873 he had lived at Brantwood on the shore of Coniston Water, 22 miles from Wray. He had already been involved in a conservation campaign, unsuccessfully opposing the damming of Thirlmere  to create a reservoir for the city of Manchester, nearly 100 miles away. Rawnsley visited Ruskin frequently, and in 1880 they discussed "how to add happiness to the country labourer's lot". The two agreed that "idle hands should have something found for them to do by other than the Devil … We must bring joy, the joy of eye and hand-skill to our cottage homes". Ruskin suggested reviving the old craft of hand-spinning and weaving wool; Rawnsley, considering this infeasible, opted for wood carving. He recorded that "a lady was engaged to come down from South Kensington to give a course of lessons in the three villages, and our humble home industry in the lake district was set on foot." Instruction also included techniques for metal repoussé, taught by the Swiss butler from Edith Rawnsley's family home.

The young Beatrix Potter holidayed at Wray Castle with her parents in 1882. They met Rawnsley, who became a firm friend, particularly of Beatrix. His views on preserving the natural beauty of the Lake District had a lasting effect on her. He was the first published author she had met, and he took a great interest in her drawings, supporting her in her determination to have them taken seriously and later encouraging her to publish her first book, The Tale of Peter Rabbit. They remained close for the rest of Rawnsley's lifetime, and Noel Rawnsley maintained in his later years that Potter had been the real love of his father's life.

Campaigning against railway development

In 1883 parliamentary approval was given for a scheme to build a railway line through the Newlands Valley to carry slate from quarries; the valley was, and is, regarded as one of the most beautiful and tranquil in the Lake District. A rival scheme was proposed, to run between Ennerdale Water and the coast. Rawnsley spearheaded a campaign to stop both. Ruskin gave his support, although after the failure of his Thirlmere campaign he was not optimistic about the outcome.
Rawnsley held meetings, lobbied assiduously and wrote prolifically to legislators and newspapers. In a letter to The Standard he said:

Rawnsley founded the Derwentwater and Borrowdale Defence Committee and enlisted the support of the Commons Preservation Society and the Kyrle Society, two established campaigning conservation organisations headed by well-known figures including Octavia and Miranda Hill, George Shaw Lefevre, James Bryce and Robert Hunter. The public paid heed, and protests became so widespread and so strong that the schemes were dropped. Griffiths writes that although by no means solely responsible for the successful outcome of the campaign, Rawnsley "became a local and national hero almost overnight, and a new awareness of landscape preservation came to the fore".

The success of the campaign led to the formation of the Lake District Defence Society (later to become The Friends of the Lake District). Rawnsley proposed the foundation of the organisation at a meeting of the Wordsworth Society in 1883. He maintained that for the sake of Wordsworth's literary heritage it was necessary to protect the landscape that had inspired him. The stated aim of the society was "to protect the Lake District from those injurious encroachments upon its scenery which are from time to time attempted from purely commercial or speculative motives, without regard to its claim as a national recreation ground". Besides Rawnsley, founder-members included Ruskin, Robert Browning, the Duke of Westminster and Alfred, Lord Tennyson, with whom Rawnsley had a family connection. As well as saving the landscape from insensitive development, Rawnsley and his colleagues aimed to protect rights of way and the use of common land. The new society gained support not only among local people but throughout Britain, including the cities; there was support from outside Britain, particularly from the United States.

Vicar of Crosthwaite

During the time the Lake District Defence Society was being formed, the Bishop of Carlisle, Harvey Goodwin, offered Rawnsley the post of vicar of St Kentigern's Church, Crosthwaite and rural dean of Keswick. Goodwin said, "In my opinion the post which I offer you is as near Heaven as anything in this world can be". Rawnsley took up the appointment in July 1883.

By contrast with the tiny parish of Wray, which had a population of about 100, Crosthwaite was substantial, with not only St Kentigern's but five outlying churches in the surrounding countryside. The parish was founded in the sixth century, and there was much to appeal to Rawnsley's sense of history. He revived the traditional symbols of St Kentigern – a robin, a tree, a bell and a salmon with a ring in its mouth – incorporating them in the mosaic floor of the church. He threw himself vigorously into parish life, "friend to both landowner and boatman, tourist and local" in Griffiths's words. At the same time he continued to campaign on a large number of national issues, not only supporting conservation but opposing such practices as vivisection, rabbit coursing, the cruel trapping of animals, and what he called "murderous millinery" – the killing of birds to use their feathers in hats. "If there was a committee, he was on it; a church fete, he was opening it", commented Griffiths. One of his parishioners called him "the most active volcano in Europe". Both Murphy and Griffiths add that his reforming zeal sometimes made him "intolerably authoritarian"; his gardener referred to him as a "peppery old swine".

In November 1884 Rawnsley and his wife began organising classes in metalwork and wood carving. There was considerable unemployment in Keswick and the surrounding area, particularly in the winter months, and the Rawnsleys aimed to provide productive and satisfying work. 
Rawnsley was mindful of advice given to him by William Morris: 
 The classes, for men only, were held in the parish rooms near the centre of the town, under the supervision of Edith Rawnsley, assisted by a local designer and another professional from the South Kensington School of Design. This led to the establishment of the Keswick School of Industrial Art.  It flourished and quickly gained a reputation for high-quality copper and silver decorative metalwork. By 1888 nearly seventy men were attending the classes. By 1890 the school was exhibiting nationally and winning prizes. To accommodate the increased numbers of students Rawnsley raised funds for a purpose-built home for the school, adjacent to the River Greta. It opened in 1894 and in 1898 a full-time head, Harold Stabler, was appointed, succeeded in 1900 by Herbert Maryon. The school was mainly financed from sales of its products, and continued in operation until 1984. For the women of Keswick and the district the Rawnsleys introduced spinning and weaving classes, led by Marion Twelves, a protégée of Ruskin. Rawnsley was proud that when Ruskin died in 1900, the pall for the coffin was handspun and handwoven in Keswick under Twelves's direction.

In 1887 Rawnsley revived the moribund Keswick and District Footpath Preservation Society, with the principal aim of stopping landowners blocking public rights of way across their land. The owner of Fawe Park, Portinscale, had done so between the Derwentwater shore and the slopes of Catbells. When persuasion failed, Rawnsley led hundreds of demonstrators to demolish the barriers. Bott comments that this dispute roused local passions, but that the next confrontation between Rawnsley and local landowners earned national headlines. The owner of Latrigg, a fell overlooking Keswick, attempted to block access along two paths and challenged the objectors to trespass, with a view to bringing a test case in court. The barriers were torn down and more than 2,000 people marched to the Latrigg summit. The case came to trial and a compromise was reached: one path remained closed but the other was recognised as an inalienable public right of way.

In addition to his post at Crosthwaite, Rawnsley was appointed as an honorary canon of Carlisle Cathedral in 1891. Within his parish, his interest in education led him to take a large part in founding Keswick High School, one of the first co-educational secondary schools in the country, which opened in October 1898. He was chairman of the school's board of governors, and Cumberland's director of education described him as "the real founder of the Keswick High School". To Rawnsley, education was not merely about the basic "three Rs"; it had to also incorporate culture, art, awareness of nature and responsibility to all living things.

County Councillor
Of the three people who later founded the National Trust, Rawnsley was the only one who associated himself even loosely with a party political movement. Robert Hunter, as a civil servant, was not permitted to do so and Octavia Hill was wary of governments and parties in general. There were two main British parties at the time: the Conservatives, seen as defending the interests of the landed aristocracy, and the Liberals, generally more sympathetic to ideas about environmental protection and public access to the countryside. When English local government was reorganised in the late 1880s Rawnsley stood as an independent Liberal for the newly-formed Cumberland County Council in January 1889. He was elected as the member for Keswick.

Rawnsley became chairman of the council's Highways Committee. He stood out against the construction of roads over lakeland passes, secured controls over mining pollution, and promoted adequate signposting of footpaths. As a councillor he was continually at odds with the brewing industry. He hated drunkenness, and opposed what he saw as excessive numbers of public houses and unduly lax alcohol licensing regulations. But he was never a prohibitionist: after returning from a tour of French vineyards he wrote to The Times protesting against Britain's high tax on the importation of French wine, which he saw as unfair and as contributing to rural poverty in France.

Ruskin's emphasis on practical skills was a lifelong influence on Rawnsley, and as a county councillor he promoted a mobile dairy hygiene unit. Its horse-drawn dairies toured the farms and villages, showing how to produce butter and cheese to the highest standards. Griffiths comments that it not only improved life for local farm workers but also led to increased competition against Danish dairy imports. This initiative developed into the Newton Rigg Farm School, near Penrith, which opened in 1896 and (at 2020) continues as Newton Rigg College. Rawnsley was also instrumental in founding a sanatorium for tuberculosis patients on Blencathra, 900 ft (275m) above sea level, where the mountain air was believed to be beneficial. His concern for the health of the community prompted him to campaign against over-processed white bread, encourage fell running and above all strive to ensure that footpaths were kept open to allow walking. He lost his seat on the council in 1895, the vote probably tipped by objections to his firm stance on public houses and alcohol licensing.

National Trust

By 1890 Rawnsley had become convinced that the surest means of protecting land for public enjoyment was not lobbying or legislation but ownership. There had been cases in which people wished to give or bequeath property to the public, but there was no suitable national body that was legally capable of owning it. In 1884 Hunter had proposed "the formation of a corporate company" to hold properties "with a view to the protection of the public interest in the open spaces of the country". Hill was in favour of the idea but the Commons Preservation Society was against it, fearing that such a body would compete with it for public support; the proposal was allowed to lapse. In 1893 several important properties in the Lake District came up for sale, and Rawnsley went to London to discuss with Hunter and Hill how the sites might be acquired for the public. They agreed to revive the proposal of a national trust. An inaugural meeting was convened at Grosvenor House, London, in July 1894; Hunter and Rawnsley were elected chairman and secretary respectively. The National Trust for Places of Historic Interest or Natural Beauty formally came into being in January 1895.

Until his death, Rawnsley worked as honorary secretary to the Trust. He was responsible for the campaign to raise the £6,500 needed to buy Brandlehow Woods and Fell, a 105 acre property, the National Trust's first purchase in the Lake District. He was at the forefront of successful efforts to buy other properties in Cumberland and Westmorland: the 750 acre Gowbarrow Fell at Ullswater (1906); a large tract at the southern end of Derwentwater 1908, including a wooded knoll given by the Rawnsleys to mark their 25th year in the district (1908); extensive holdings in Borrowdale including the Bowder Stone (1910); and the site of the Castlerigg stone circle (1913). He was active elsewhere in the country on the National Trust's behalf. By the time of his death in 1920 the trust held 994 estates throughout England and Wales, including Waggoners Wells, Hampshire, acquired in memory of Hunter and Hydon's Ball, Surrey, in memory of Hill.

Later years
Rawnsley was a frequent traveller. He and his wife made several walking and painting tours in the Alps, visited the Holy Land and went to Egypt when their son was working there in Sir Flinders Petrie's archaeological team. Rawnsley published accounts of his trips and books of poetry inspired by them. In 1896 he went to Russia as a newspaper correspondent to cover the coronation of Nicholas II, and three years later he toured the eastern states of the United States as ambassador for the National Trust.

After the launch of the National Trust, Rawnsley continued to campaign on other issues about which he felt strongly. He took a leading role in the erection of monuments to Wordsworth (Cockermouth, 1896), Caedmon (Whitby, 1896) and Bede (Monkwearmouth, 1903). He turned his attention to the cinema, where he was strongly against the depiction of sex and violence. His loathing of indecency extended to an aversion to saucy seaside postcards. He encouraged young people not to attend "lurid crime films at kinemas", and turn instead to wholesome organisations such as the YMCA, Boy Scouts and Girl Guides.

In 1898 Rawnsley was offered the bishopric of Madagascar, but declined it, feeling himself committed to his conservation work in the Lake District and, by then, in many other parts of the British countryside. In 1909 he was appointed a residentiary canon of Carlisle Cathedral, and spent three months a year staying in the Cathedral Close.

A local controversy in 1911 made national news, when Rawnsley and Hunter successfully opposed the county council's proposal to demolish the medieval Portinscale bridge across the River Derwent near St Kentigern's and replace it with a modern structure. Proponents of a new bridge maintained that antiquity alone did not justify retaining an old structure: it must, they contended, have "historic associations". This argument was widely ridiculed and the council backed down, outmanoeuvred by Rawnsley, who, together with the owner of the adjacent property, offered to underwrite the cost of strengthening the old bridge.

In 1912 Rawnsley was appointed to the honorary position of chaplain to the king, and he held the post of chaplain to the Border Regiment of the Territorial Force, with the rank of colonel.  When the First World War began in 1914 Rawnsley's views were straightforward: "The German envy and hate, which has been nursed against us secretly for the last 30 years, is now seen in all its open madness. It is the blackest and most devilish thing that has been heard of in history". He urged the young men of Cumberland to fight "for home and Empire". Among the volunteers was his son, Noel, who survived the war. Rawnsley's confidence was shaken as the war went on and the lists of casualties grew longer and longer.  When the war ended he was at the forefront of organising the peace celebrations.

In 1915, with a view to eventual retirement, Rawnsley bought Allan Bank, Grasmere, a house in which Wordsworth had lived between 1808 and 1811. While he was staying at Carlisle in December 1916 his wife died at Crosthwaite from cardiac arrest brought on by influenza. Rawnsley, who had also caught influenza, was too ill to attend her funeral. In his absence the service was led by the Bishop of Barrow-in-Furness, Campbell West-Watson.

Rawnsley felt unable to carry on without Edith's help, and the week after Easter 1917 he resigned from St Kentigern's after 34 years and retired to Allan Bank. He continued his work for the National Trust and remained an active Canon of Carlisle. In 1918 he married Eleanor "Nellie" Foster Simpson, a long-standing friend to him and Edith, who had for some years been his secretary. After the marriage the couple's honeymoon consisted of a tour of National Trust properties in Wales, a trip that was the basis of Rawnsley's last book, a study of thirteen of the trust's properties in Wales and the West Country.

Rawnsley suffered a heart attack and died at Allan Bank on 28 May 1920, after a brief illness. He was buried in the churchyard of St Kentigern's alongside Edith. He bequeathed Allan Bank to the National Trust, with a lifetime lease to Eleanor, who lived there until her death in 1959.

Legacy
In its obituary notice, The Times wrote that "It is no exaggeration to say – and it is much to say of anyone – that England would be a much duller and less healthy and happy country if [Rawnsley] had not lived and worked." To commemorate him, the National Trust raised funds soon after his death to buy Friars' Crag, Lord's Island and other land bordering Derwentwater. A memorial stone is set in the wall alongside the path from the Keswick landing stages to the end of Friars' Crag. Eleanor Rawnsley wrote a biography of her husband, published by his regular publisher, MacLehose, in 1923. 

Rawnsley published more than forty books, some on religious subjects, many with a Lake District theme, and, as the Oxford Dictionary of National Biography put it, "as a minor lake poet, a vast output of verse." His memoir of Ruskin (1901) was described by The New York Times as "in many ways the best volume [of] his series of books upon some of the literary aspects of the Lake Country".

Books by Rawnsley

  
 
 
 
 
 
 
 
 
 
 
 
 
 
 
 
 
 
 

 
 
 
 
 
 
 
 
 
 
  (by Giovanni Parenti, translated and edited by Rawnsley)

Notes, references and sources

Notes

References

Sources

Books

Journals

External links

 
Biography at Visit Cumbria
Beatrix Potter's Lake District (Liverpool Museums)
Poems, Ballads, and Bucolics, by Hardwicke Drummond Rawnsley
A Book of Bristol Sonnets, by Hardwicke Drummond Rawnsley
Ruskin and the English Lakes, by Hardwicke Drummond Rawnsley
Sermons of Canon H D Rawnsley at Cumbria Archive Centre, Kendal

1851 births
1920 deaths
Alumni of Balliol College, Oxford
British environmentalists
Church of England hymnwriters
English male poets
Members of Cumberland County Council
People educated at Uppingham School
19th-century English Anglican priests
20th-century English Anglican priests
National Trust people
People from Grasmere (village)